Manon Fiorot (born February 17, 1990) is a French mixed martial artist, currently competing in the Flyweight division in the  Ultimate Fighting Championship (UFC). As of March 7, 2023, she is #2 in the UFC women's flyweight rankings, and #11 in the UFC women's pound-for-pound rankings.

Background

Fiorot's athletic career began at the age of 7 with karate. Later, she took up residence at a snowboarding school, and won the French Snowboarding Championship.

At age 18, Fiorot returned to karate and earned her black belt before joining the French national team. In 2014, she was selected for the World Karate Championships, but was seriously injured shortly thereafter. After recovering, she discovered kickboxing and Thai boxing in which she won several national competitions.

In amateur Muay Thai, her record is 12 victories and 0 defeats, and she holds two national champion titles. Fiorot also holds a Black belt in karate, and three national champion titles in K-1.

Mixed martial arts career

Early career 
In 2017, she participated in the European Amateur Championships where she lost in the finals to the wrestling of Cornelia Holm. A few months later, she won the IMMAF World Amateur Championships.  Her record in amateur fighting was 7 wins with 1 loss.

On June 16, 2018, she fought professionally for the first time against Leah McCourt in the Cage Warriors organization at Cage Warriors 94 and lost by split decision.

In 2019, she traveled to Johannesburg to join a reality show called "The Fighter" organized by the Extreme Fighting Championship (EFC). After 2 months of competition, she won the reality show's contest and joined the EFC. In December 2019, she won against Amanda Lino, becoming the EFC Women's Flyweight World Champion.

After earning her title, she joined UAE Warriors. At UAE Warriors 12, she defeated Corinne Laframboise via TKO in round three. Fiorot defeated Naomi Tataroglu via TKO in the second round at UAE Warriors 13. At UAE 14, she defeated Gabriela Campos via TKO in the first round, capturing the UAEW Flyweight Championship.

Ultimate Fighting Championship
Fiorot made her UFC debut on January 20, 2021 at UFC on ESPN: Chiesa vs. Magny against Victoria Leonardo. She won the fight via second-round technical knockout.

Fiorot was scheduled to face Maryna Moroz on June 5, 2021 at UFC Fight Night: Rozenstruik vs. Sakai. However, Moroz was pulled from the event for undisclosed reasons, and she was replaced by Tabatha Ricci. Fiorot won the bout via standing TKO in the second round.

Fiorot was scheduled to face Mayra Bueno Silva on September 25, 2021 at UFC 266. However, the bout was postponed to UFC Fight Night: Ladd vs. Dumont due to COVID-19 protocols. Fiorot won the fight via unanimous decision.

As the first bout of her new multi-fight contract, Fiorot was scheduled to face Jessica Eye on March 5, 2022 at UFC 272. However, a week before the event, Eye withdrew due to injury and the bout was cancelled.

Fiorot faced Jennifer Maia vs on March 26, 2022 at UFC on ESPN 33. She won the fight by unanimous decision.

Fiorot was scheduled to face Katlyn Chookagian on September 3, 2022, at UFC Fight Night 209. However, Chookagian withdrew due to unknown reasons in mid June and was replaced by former UFC Women's Strawweight Champion Jéssica Andrade.  In turn, Andrade withdrew in mid July due to undisclosed reasons and was replaced by Fiorot's original opponent Chookagian. After Fiorot injured her knee, the bout was eventually shifted to take place at UFC 280 on October 22, 2022. At the weigh-ins, Chookagian weighed in at 127.5 pounds, 1.5 pounds over the flyweight non-title fight limit. Chookagian was fined 20% of her purse, which will go to her opponent  Fiorot. She won the fight by unanimous decision.

Championships and accomplishments

Mixed martial arts
Extreme Fighting Championship
EFC Women's Flyweight World Championship (One time)UAE Warriors
UAEW Flyweight Championship (One time)

Mixed martial arts record

|-
|Win
|align=center|10–1
|Katlyn Chookagian
|Decision (unanimous)
|UFC 280
|
|align=center|3
|align=center|5:00
|Abu Dhabi, United Arab Emirates
|
|-
|Win
|align=center|9–1
|Jennifer Maia
|Decision (unanimous)
|UFC on ESPN: Blaydes vs. Daukaus
|
|align=center|3
|align=center|5:00
|Columbus, Ohio, United States
|
|-
|Win
|align=center|8–1
|Mayra Bueno Silva
|Decision (unanimous)
|UFC Fight Night: Ladd vs. Dumont
|
|align=center|3
|align=center|5:00
|Las Vegas, Nevada, United States
|
|-
|Win
|align=center|7–1
|Tabatha Ricci
|TKO (punches)
|UFC Fight Night: Rozenstruik vs. Sakai 
|
|align=center|2
|align=center|3:00
|Las Vegas, Nevada, United States
|
|-
| Win
| align=center| 6–1
| Victoria Leonardo
|TKO (head kick and punches)
|UFC on ESPN: Chiesa vs. Magny
|
|align=center|2
|align=center|4:08
|Abu Dhabi, United Arab Emirates
| 
|-
| Win
| align=center| 5–1
| Gabriela Campo
|TKO (punches)
|UAE Warriors 14
|
|align=center| 1
|align=center| 4:48
|Abu Dhabi, United Arab Emirates
|
|-
| Win
| align=center| 4–1
| Naomi Tataroglu
|TKO (punches)
|UAE Warriors 13
|
|align=center|2
|align=center|3:00
|Abu Dhabi, United Arab Emirates
| 
|-
| Win
| align=center| 3–1
| Corinne Laframboise
| TKO (punches)
| UAE Warriors 12
| 
| align=center| 3
| align=center| 1:52
| Abu Dhabi, United Arab Emirates
|
|-
| Win
| align=center| 2–1
| Amanda Lino
| Decision (unanimous)
| EFC 83
| 
| align=center| 5
| align=center| 5:00
| Pretoria, South Africa
|
|-
| Win
| align=center| 1–1
|Mellony Geugjes
|TKO (punches)
|EFC 80
|
|align=center|3
|align=center|4:17
|Sibaya, South Africa
|
|-
| Loss
| align=center|0–1
| Leah McCourt
| Decision (split)
| Cage Warriors 94
| 
| align=center| 3
| align=center| 5:00
| Antwerp, Belgium
|
|-

See also
List of current UFC fighters
List of female mixed martial artists

References

External links
 
 

Living people
1990 births
Sportspeople from Nice
Flyweight mixed martial artists
Mixed martial artists utilizing karate
Mixed martial artists utilizing Muay Thai
Mixed martial artists utilizing Brazilian jiu-jitsu
French practitioners of Brazilian jiu-jitsu
Female Brazilian jiu-jitsu practitioners
French female karateka
French female mixed martial artists
French female kickboxers
French Muay Thai practitioners
Female Muay Thai practitioners
Ultimate Fighting Championship female fighters